Inlay Lake Wetland Sanctuary is a protected area in Myanmar's Shan State, covering an area of  surrounding Inle Lake. It was gazetted in 1985 to protect habitats for migratory birds. In 2003, it was designated as one of the ASEAN Heritage Parks, and in 2015 as the first Biosphere Reserve in the country.

255 woodland birds, 90 wetland birds, 59 fish species, 3 turtle species, 94 butterfly species, 25 amphibian and reptile species, and several plant species including 184 orchid and 12 algae species are recorded in this wetland. It was reported that this Sanctuary could be a nesting place for the globally endangered sarus crane.

References

External links

Protected areas of Myanmar
Protected areas established in 1985
Important Bird Areas of Myanmar
Shan Hills
ASEAN heritage parks
1985 establishments in Burma